Why Get a Divorce? (German: Warum sich scheiden lassen?) is a 1926 German silent comedy film directed by Manfred Noa and starring André Mattoni, Vivian Gibson, and Colette Brettel. It premiered in Berlin on 4 March 1926. It was shot at the Terra Studios in Berlin. The film's art direction was by Julius von Borsody.

Cast
 André Mattoni   
 Vivian Gibson   
 Colette Brettel   
 Margarete Kupfer   
 Max Landa   
 Emil Heyse   
 Ellen Heel   
 Henry Bender   
 Hermann Picha

References

Bibliography
 Grange, William. Cultural Chronicle of the Weimar Republic. Scarecrow Press, 2008.

External links

1926 films
German comedy films
Films of the Weimar Republic
German silent feature films
Films directed by Manfred Noa
German black-and-white films
Terra Film films
1926 comedy films
Silent comedy films
Films shot at Terra Studios
1920s German films